This is a list of diplomatic missions in Mozambique. At present, the capital city of Maputo hosts 52 embassies/high commissions. Several other countries have honorary consuls to provide emergency services to their citizens. Several other countries have non-resident ambassadors accredited from other regional capitals, such as Pretoria and Harare.

Diplomatic missions in Maputo

Embassies/High Commissions

Other missions and delegations
 (Diplomatic office)
 (Delegation)

Gallery

Consular missions

Beira 
 (Consulate-General)
 (Consulate-General)

Tete 
 (Consulate)

Non-resident embassies/high commissions 
In Pretoria except as otherwise noted:

 (Cairo)

 (Harare)

 (Addis Ababa)
 (Luanda)

 (Addis Ababa)

 (Harare)

 (Harare)

 (Pretoria)
 (Luanda)
 (New Delhi)

 (New Delhi)

 

 (Dar es Salaam)

 (Nairobi)

 (Mbabane) 

 (Luanda)

Closed missions

See also 
 Foreign relations of Mozambique
 List of diplomatic missions of Mozambique
 Visa policy of Mozambique
 Visa requirements for Mozambican citizens

References

External links 
 Maputo Diplomatic List
 Consular list

Foreign relations of Mozambique
Mozambique
Diplomatic missions